Martha Is Dead is a psychological horror game developed by Italian studio LKA and published by Wired Productions for Microsoft Windows, PlayStation 4, PlayStation 5, Xbox One, Xbox Series X/S and Amazon Luna.

Gameplay 
Martha Is Dead is a survival horror game that is presented in a first-person perspective.

Plot 

Set during the late years of World War 2 in a fictional town in Tuscany within German-occupied Italy, twin sisters Martha and Giulia spend their childhood in their nanny’s estate. Martha has been deaf since early childhood and their mother, Irene, blames Giulia for having applied blunt force to her sister while in the womb. Their father, Erich, serves as a general in the German army. Giulia’s nanny recounts the legend of the White Lady, a malicious spirit of a woman whose lover murdered her and was hung from a tree on an island in the center of the estate’s nearby lake. 

One afternoon, as young adults, Giulia asks Martha to accompany her to a lake in a nearby forest to take photographs. However, Martha is not in the house the next morning and Giulia takes the photos alone. She discovers her sister’s corpse and is found by her parents. Her mother mistakes Giulia for Martha, forcing Giulia to assume her twin sister’s identity. 

Giulia’s mental state deteriorates in the days following her sister’s death. She struggles to remember the events of the day her sister died due to memory lapses. 
While exploring the surrounding woods, Giulia finds the corpse of her boyfriend, Lapo, a soldier of the Italian resistance, before she’s shot herself. Irene finds Giulia and she recovers, though her story is misconstrued in the local newspaper.

After Martha’s funeral, Giulia indirectly reveals her identity to her mother by playing the piano. Suspecting that her mother played a role in her sister’s death, Giulia obtains instructions to contact the White Lady from her Nanny. On the beach at the forest edge, she finds the reel of film she had used moments before her sister’s death. Giulia rows to the island where the White Lady’s lover was hung. After using tarot cards to communicate with her, Giulia obtains the key to her sister’s trinket box and wakes up in her bathtub at the estate.

In Martha’s trinket box, Giulia finds a letter from Martha explaining that she had feigned deaf after Irene frightened her during their childhood. She explains that she felt guilty about Irene’s favorism towards her and her disdain towards Giulia, and intended to enrage and be murdered by Irene while Irene was under the impression that she murdered Giulia, so that Giulia could take Martha’s place. Martha also confesses to having been pregnant with Lapo’s child—she lied to Irene that it was Giulia who was pregnant so that Martha could pretend to be Giulia and become the casualty of her mother’s wrath. 

Giulia travels to her family’s crypt to determine if Martha was truly pregnant. She removes a deformed, two-headed fetus from Martha’s embalmed body and promises to “fix” her sister’s body later. Giulia discovers that Irene has made arrangements with a mental asylum to take Giulia away and travels back to the estate. Before developing the reel of film from the day Martha died, Giulia interrogates and shoots Irene, finding the key to her childhood bedroom. Suddenly, bombs strike the estate and remove power to the house. 

Giulia comes to and revisits her childhood bedroom. She plays with her puppet theatre, and a puppet show reveals that Giulia dismembered her mother and buried her body under a bridge in the woods. After, she returns to the estate to find that power has returned. 

Giulia develops the reel and learns that she was the one who killed Martha, not her mother. She’s ambushed by soldiers from the Italian resistance and tortured alongside her father, Erich, who is killed. However, Giulia is spared. 

Now alone, Giulia returns to the darkroom and plays a recording of her mother’s confession, which reveals that Martha does not exist as Giulia’s twin sister—rather, Giulia is an alternate personality of Martha. She plays with her puppet theater once more, walking through her rough upbringing in which Irene’s abusive parenting caused a split in Martha’s personality: a quiet, beloved Martha and troublesome, loathed Giulia.

In the present, Giulia calls the town’s priest, who convinces her to come to the church, where staff from the mental asylum finally take her away. Giulia becomes self-harmful while in the asylum and masturbates habitually to the point of physical harm. In her headspace, Giulia talks to an alternate ego of herself and considers what events were fact and which were fiction. Regardless of the player’s choices for her responses, the sequence ends with Giulia slitting her forearms. 

In her narration, Giulia states that she has since recovered and can put the events of the past behind her.

Reception 

Martha Is Dead received "mixed or average" reviews, according to review aggregator Metacritic.

Controversy 
Martha Is Dead was censored for its release on PlayStation consoles. The changes include removing interactivity from certain graphic scenes and removing references to masturbation. The game is uncut on all other platforms.

References

External links 
 

2022 video games
Censored video games
Child abuse in fiction
Psychological horror games
PlayStation 4 games
PlayStation 5 games
Single-player video games
Unreal Engine games
Video games about mental health
Video games developed in Italy
Video games featuring female protagonists
Video games set in Italy
Windows games
Xbox One games
Wired Productions games